Jentah Sobott is an Australian actress, best known for her recurring role in the cult television drama Prisoner as Heather "Mouse" Trapp. Sobott worked in theatre, before being given a role in Prisoner initially as an extra in 2 different roles, before becoming a regular cast member. She has also appeared in Australian film.

Filmography

External links
 

Living people
Australian film actresses
Australian soap opera actresses
Australian stage actresses
Year of birth missing (living people)
20th-century Australian actresses
21st-century Australian actresses